This is the discography of Chris Cornell, an American rock musician. This list does not include material recorded by Cornell with Soundgarden, Temple of the Dog, or Audioslave, of which he was the main vocalist, frontman, and rhythm guitarist. His four solo studio albums released during his lifetime were Euphoria Morning (1999), Carry On (2007), Scream (2009), and Higher Truth (2015). A fifth, No One Sings Like You Anymore, Vol. 1, was released posthumously in 2020. His two compilation albums (including one posthumous) were The Roads We Choose – A Retrospective (2007) and Chris Cornell (2018). He released one live album, titled Songbook. Cornell made numerous soundtrack contributions and released nineteen singles. With Soundgarden, he produced six albums, five EPs, and two greatest hits compilations. He released three albums with Audioslave and one with Temple of the Dog. Cornell also co-produced the Screaming Trees album Uncle Anesthesia.

Albums

Studio albums

Live albums

Compilation albums

Extended plays

Singles

Notes

Other charted songs

Music videos

Other appearances

Contributions and collaborations

See also
 List of songs recorded by Chris Cornell

References

Rock music discographies
Discographies of American artists
Discography